HMAS Bayonet (P 101) was an  of the Royal Australian Navy (RAN).

Design and construction

The Attack class was ordered in 1964 to operate in Australian waters as patrol boats (based on lessons learned through using the s on patrols of Borneo during the Indonesia-Malaysia Confrontation, and to replace a variety of old patrol, search-and-rescue, and general-purpose craft. Initially, nine were ordered for the RAN, with another five for Papua New Guinea's Australian-run coastal security force, although another six ships were ordered to bring the class to twenty vessels. Propulsion machinery consisted of two 16-cylinder Paxman YJCM diesel engines, which supplied  to the two propellers. The ship's company consisted of three officers and sixteen sailors. Main armament was a bow-mounted Bofors 40 mm gun, supplemented by two .50-calibre M2 Browning machine guns and various small arms. The ships were designed with as many commercial components as possible: the Attacks were to operate in remote regions of Australia and New Guinea, and a town's hardware store would be more accessible than home base in a mechanical emergency.

Bayonet was laid down by Walkers Limited at Maryborough, Queensland in October 1968, launched on 6 November 1968, and commissioned on 22 February 1969.

Operational history
Bayonet was transferred to the Melbourne Port Division of the Royal Australian Naval Reserve on 27 March 1982.

Fate
Bayonet paid off on 26 June 1988. Although the vessel was retained by the Australian government, by 1999 she was in a dilapidated condition, so was scuttled on 21 September 1999, sinking off Cape Schanck, Victoria in Bass Strait, in an area known to divers as the Victorian Ships' Graveyard.

Sand ripples around the wreck are evidence of strong currents in the area. There is a hole in the foredeck at the forward gun position, and there is a substantial amount of wiring still present inside the wreck which may be an entanglement hazard. Dives on he Bayonet require the use of trimix to limit nitrogen narcosis.

Latitude: 38° 43.050′ S, Longitude: 144° 35.250′ E, Datum: WGS84

Citations

References

Attack-class patrol boats
Ships built in Queensland
1968 ships
Scuttled vessels of Australia
Underwater diving sites in Australia
Shipwrecks of Victoria (Australia)